The 1984 Spanish motorcycle Grand Prix was the third round of the 1984 Grand Prix motorcycle racing season. It took place on the weekend of 5–6 May 1984 at the Circuito Permanente del Jarama.

Classification

500 cc

References

Spanish motorcycle Grand Prix
Spanish
Spanish motorcycle Grand Prix
motorcycle Grand Prix